The Vaccine and Infectious Disease Organization – International Vaccine Centre (VIDO-InterVac) is a research organization of the University of Saskatchewan that operates with financial support from the Government of Canada, the government of Saskatchewan, livestock industry councils and agencies, foundations and human and animal health companies. In addition to the  facility on campus, VIDO-InterVac also operates a  research station.

VIDO-InterVac's aims are to protect Canada and the world from infectious diseases by focusing on diseases that: affect livestock industries; are important to human health; and are emerging diseases including zoonoses.

History
Originally named the Veterinary Infectious Disease Organization, VIDO-InterVac was established with funding from the Devonian Group of Charitable Foundations, the Province of Alberta and the Province of Saskatchewan. VIDO had strong ties to the Western College of Veterinary Medicine at the University of Saskatchewan. The laboratory took on its current name in March 2003. In October 2003, a  expansion was completed.

In March 2004, VIDO received funding for the construction one of the world's largest and most advanced biosafety level 3 facilities, the International Vaccine Centre (InterVac), for research into emerging and reemerging human and animal diseases. The approximately CA$150 million in funding needed for infrastructure was provided by the Government of Canada, the Canada Foundation for Innovation, the Government of Saskatchewan, the University of Saskatchewan, and the City of Saskatoon.

InterVac finished construction in 2011 with a celebration that included then-prime minister Stephen Harper, Saskatchewan premier Brad Wall, and Saskatoon mayor Don Atchison. It received operational certification by the Public Health Agency of Canada and Canadian Food Inspection Agency in 2013. InterVac is one of the few level 3 facilities in the world capable of working with large animals including cattle, deer, elk, alpacas, sheep, and pigs.

The organization has had five directors since its inception. Chris Bigland was the founding director and ran the organization from 1975 to 1984. Its other directors have been Stephen Acres (1984–1993), Lorne Babiuk (1993–2007), Andrew Potter (2007–2018), and Volker Gerdts (2019–present).

VIDO-InterVac has created three spin-off companies (Biostar, Biowest, and Star Biotech).

COVID-19 research
During the COVID-19 pandemic, the Government of Saskatchewan has provided $4.2 million to VIDO- InterVac. It also received $23 million in federal funding announced on March 23 for the centre's manufacturing facility to produce COVID-19 vaccines for clinical trials, and overall operational costs.

Vaccines
 Vicogen (cattle) – Prevention of calf scours
 Ecolan RC (cattle) – Prevention of bacterial and viral calf scours
 Hevlan TC (poultry) – Prevention of enteritis in turkeys
 Pneumo-Star (cattle) – Prevention of Pasteurella infection
 Somnu-Star (cattle) – Prevention of Haemophilosis in cattle
 Somnu-Star Ph (cattle) – Prevention of Pasteurellosis and Haemophilosis in cattle
 Pleuro-Star 4 (swine) – Prevention of Porcine Pleuropneumonia
 Econiche (cattle) – Reduction of shedding of Ecoli O157 to control human infection and environmental contamination

In 2020, VIDO-InterVac began developing a vaccine for SARS-CoV-2 during the COVID-19 pandemic.

References

External links
 

COVID-19 vaccine producers
Scientific organizations based in Canada
University of Saskatchewan
Medical and health organizations based in Saskatchewan
Medical research institutes in Canada
Organizations based in Saskatoon
Veterinary organizations
Laboratories in Canada
BSL3 laboratories in Canada
Veterinary medicine in Canada